Neuronal acetylcholine receptor subunit alpha-3, also known as nAChRα3, is a protein that in humans is encoded by the CHRNA3 gene. The protein encoded by this gene is a subunit of certain nicotinic acetylcholine receptors (nAchR).  Research with mecamylamine in animals has implicated alpha-3-containing nAChRs in the abusive and addictive properties of ethanol.

Interactive pathway map

See also
 Nicotinic acetylcholine receptor

References

Further reading

External links 
 
 

Nicotinic acetylcholine receptors